The Xi Jinping Administration of the Chinese Communist Party (CCP), officially called the "CCP Central Committee with Comrade Xi Jinping as General Secretary" between 2012 and 2016, and "CCP Central Committee with Comrade Xi Jinping at its core" since 2016, has been said to begin after the progressive accumulation of power by Xi Jinping, who succeeded Hu Jintao as CCP General Secretary and Paramount leader in 2012 and later in 2016 was proclaimed the Party's 4th leadership core, following Mao Zedong, Deng Xiaoping, and Jiang Zemin.

References 

Administration
Politics of China
Government of China
21st century in China